Henry Lawrence Garrett III (born June 24, 1939) served as the 68th Secretary of the Navy from May 15, 1989, to June 26, 1992, in the administration of George H. W. Bush. Before leading the Department of the Navy, he served as General Counsel of the Department of Defense.

Career

Garrett served in the U.S. Navy from October 1961 to November 1981, initially as a machinist's mate aboard  during the Cuban Missile Crisis, before getting commissioned as a naval flight officer in 1964. He served with VP-50 in the Vietnam War from 1965 to 1967 and was awarded the Air Medal two times during his military career. Garrett was the 68th United States Secretary of the Navy.

Garrett ultimately resigned due to the Tailhook scandal.

References

External links

1939 births
Living people
Military personnel from Washington, D.C.
United States Secretaries of the Navy
University of San Diego alumni
United States Under Secretaries of the Navy
Recipients of the Air Medal
George H. W. Bush administration personnel